Añisoc is a town in Equatorial Guinea. It is located in the province of Wele-Nzas and has a (2008 est.) population of 12,705

Populated places in Wele-Nzas